René Gainville (Budapest, 2 December 1931– Paris, 5 August 2014) was a Hungarian-born French screenwriter and film director, film producer and actor.

Biography 
René Gainville was born René Jacques Froc de Géninville on 2 December 1931 in Budapest, Hungary. Graduated from Budapest High School.

After World War II, he moved with his family to Paris, where he began his film career after graduating as a film director.

His wife was the actress Edith Vignaud, under the stage name of Anne Vernon.

They had a daughter, Catherine de Geninville.

He died on 5 August 2014 in Paris.

Filmography

Director 

 1964: Tambi (short film)
 1964: Libérez-nous du mal (short film)
 1964: Le père (short film)
 1966: L'Homme de Mykonos
 1968: Le Démoniaque / The Woman Is a Stranger
 1969: Un jeune couple  / A Young Couple
 1970: Alyse et Chloé / Alyse and Chloé
 1973: Le Complot
 1974: Le Bon Samaritain (TV)
 1975: Le Pensionnat et ses inimitiés (as Catherine Balogh)
 1975: ... Et tu n'auras d'autres adversaires que toi (TV)
 1979:  L'associé / The Associate

Assistant director 

 1965: Mission spéciale à Caracas / Mission to Caracas

Producer 

 1966: L'Homme de Mykonos
 1968: Le Démoniaque
 1970: Alyse et Chloé /  Alyse and Chloé
 1973: Le Complot
 1975: Le Pensionnat et ses inimitiés
 1979:  L'associé / The Associate 
 1996: The Associate (continued from L'Associé) 
 2001: Mikor siel az oroszlán? (Hungarian)

Screenwriter 

 1966: L'Homme de Mykonos
 1968: Le Démoniaque
 1979: L'Associé
 1996: The Associate

Actor 

 1989: Thank You Satan (André Farwagi's film)
 1996:   Kisváros / Tengerparti végjáték (TV, Hungarian)

References

External links

1941 births
2014 deaths
French screenwriters
Hungarian screenwriters
Hungarian film directors
Hungarian emigrants to France
Film directors from Paris